Piotr Paweł Morta (born 19 June 1959 in Wieluń) is a Polish political activist, dissident, economist, co-inventor, activist in underground "Solidarity", Krajowy Mistrz Racjonalizacji 1983 (Polish master of rationalization in 1983), and vice-chairman of European Works Council Pfleiderer AG.

Life

Education
He is an alumnus of the Poznań University of Economics and Business (then: Academy of Economics in Poznań). He studied management and marketing there.

Political career
In 1989 he created the Solidarity Citizens' Committee in Wieruszów. He was a member of City Council Board of Managers in years 1990-1994. He was also councillor of Gmina Wieruszów at the same time. Councillor of Wieruszów County over the period 1998-2002, 2002-2006, 2006–2010 and 2010-2014.

Other activities
In years 1998-2014 he was a chairman of the National Secretariat of Construction and Wood Workers of Independent Self-governing Labour Union "Solidarity". He has served as a chairman of the National Secretariat of Construction, Wood Workers and Environmental Protection of Independent Self-governing Labour Union "Solidarity"-80 since 2014. As a result of his efforts,"Solidarity"-80 became a member of the European Federation of Building and Woodworkers (EFBWW) on 1 July 2018. Moreover, he was vice-chairman of European Works Council Pfleiderer AG from 2007 to 2014.

Publications
Co-author of the publication "Szanse i zagrożenia rozwoju Zakładów Płyt Wiórowych Prospan S.A. będące wynikiem prywatyzacji" (Opportunities and threats to the Development of Particleboard Manufacturing Plant Prospan S.A. resulting from privatization), which was published by Poznań University of Economics and Business, Poznań 1997.

Honours

 1998: Bronze Cross of Merit
 2010: Silver Cross of Merit
 2014: Cross of Freedom and Solidarity
 2016: Odznaka honorowa "Działacza opozycji antykomunistycznej lub osoby represjonowanej z powodów politycznych" (Decoration of Honor for activist of anti-communist opposition or repressed person for political reasons)
 2016: Krzyż Niezłomni Niepokorni 1956-1989 (Cross for unbreakable and disobedient person)
 2016: Pro Patria Medal
 2017: Primus in Agendo
 2017: Złoty Kordelas Leśnika Polskiego (Gold cutlass of Polish forester) 
 2018: Order of Polonia Restituta (English: Order of the Rebirth of Poland) 
 2020: Medal of the Centenary of Regained Independence 
 2021: Medal "Pro Bono Poloniae" 

Piotr Morta is a co-inventor of chain link - this invention was patented by the Polish Patent Office. He received a certificate from the Institute of National Remembrance - Commission for the Prosecution of Crimes against the Polish Nation. According to the certificate he is a victim in the meaning of the Act on the Institute of National Remembrance. In 2017 he was awarded the title of "Meritorious for Wieruszów County".

Personal life 
Piotr Morta is married to Maria Jolanta, who is a teacher. Together they have three daughters: Natalia, Martyna, and Julia.

References

Bibliography
 Encyclopedia of Solidarity
 Recipients of Cross of Freedom and Solidarity - Biography
 

Officers of the Order of Polonia Restituta
Polish anti-communists
Polish city councillors
Polish economists
Polish trade unionists
Recipients of the Cross of Merit (Poland)
Living people
Polish dissidents
Polish inventors
Solidarity (Polish trade union) activists
1959 births
Polish Roman Catholics
20th-century Roman Catholics
21st-century Roman Catholics
Recipients of the Pro Patria Medal
Recipients of Cross of Freedom and Solidarity
Recipients of decoration of Honor for activist of anti-communist opposition or repressed person for political reasons
Recipients of the Medal of the Centenary of Regained Independence
Recipients of the Medal "Pro Bono Poloniae"
Recipients of Primus in Agendo                    
Poznań University of Economics and Business alumni
People from Wieluń